Heortia dominalis is a moth in the family Crambidae. It was described by Julius Lederer in 1863. It is found in Papua New Guinea, the Philippines and on Ternate and Seram.

The wings are purplish black with ochreous basal patch and two large yellow spots.

Subspecies
Heortia dominalis dominalis
Heortia dominalis restricta Munroe, 1977 (Papua New Guinea)

References

Moths described in 1863
Odontiinae